Martin Koscelník (born 2 March 1995) is a Slovak professional footballer who plays for Rapid Wien and Slovakia as a right-back.

Club career

MFK Zemplín Michalovce
Koscelník won the 2014–15 DOXXbet liga with the Zemplín Michalovce.

He made his Fortuna Liga debut for Zemplín against AS Trenčín on 18 July 2015. He was replaced in the second half by Martin Regáli.

International career
Koscelník was first called up to Slovakia's senior national team on 25 August 2020 by the coach Pavel Hapal for the Nations League matches against Czech Republic and Israel.

Koscelník scored his first international goal on 7 September 2021, in a FIFA World Cup qualifier against Cyprus at Tehelné pole. The match concluded in a 2-0 victory, with Koscelník's goal from beyond the Penalty area sealing the win after Ivan Schranz scored first in the 55th minute.

International goals
''As of match played on 29 March 2022. Scores and results list Slovakia's goal tally first.

Personal life
Koscelník was born in Vranov nad Topľou, Slovakia.

References

External links
 
 
 MFK Zemplín Michalovce official profile 
 Futbalnet profile 

1995 births
Living people
People from Vranov nad Topľou
Sportspeople from the Prešov Region
Slovak footballers
Slovakia international footballers
Association football midfielders
MFK Zemplín Michalovce players
2. Liga (Slovakia) players
Slovak Super Liga players
FC Slovan Liberec players
Czech First League players
UEFA Euro 2020 players
Slovak expatriate footballers
Expatriate footballers in the Czech Republic
Slovak expatriate sportspeople in the Czech Republic
SK Rapid Wien players
Slovak expatriate sportspeople in Austria
Expatriate footballers in Austria